thumb|Mayan nobleman with cacao paste, in the Choco-Story museum 
Choco-Story, the Chocolate Museum in Bruges, Belgium, is located in the sixteenth-century "Huis de Crone" building on Sint-Jansplein (at the intersection of Wijnzakstraat and Sint-Jansstraat) in central Bruges. This building was originally the home of a wine tavern. It later housed a bakery and, most recently, a furniture making shop. 

Choco-Story was opened by Eddy Van Belle and his son, Cédric.  The two are also the owners of Belcolade, a family-owned chocolate business.

Museum visitors can watch chocolate being made. 

Аdditionally, a section of the museum is dedicated to the health benefits of chocolate.

See also

 List of food and beverage museums

References

External links 
 official website
 Article on "Chocolate Atlas"
 Le musée gourmand du Chocolat - Choco-Story - Paris
 Choco-Story, The Chocolate Museum - Prague, Czech Republic
 Choco-Story - Uxmal, Yucatán, Mexico
 Belcolade plantation - Tikul, Yucatán, Mexico
 Belcolade plantation - Google Maps
 Bruges Museums

Museums in Bruges
Chocolate museums